Tanguyeh-ye Olya (also Romanized as Tangūyeh-ye ‘Olyā; also known as Tangūyeh-ye Bālā) is a village in Zakharuiyeh Rural District, Efzar District, Qir and Karzin County, Fars Province, Iran. At the 2006 census, its population was 454, in 96 families.

References 

Populated places in Qir and Karzin County